The Classiculomycetes are a class of fungi in the Pucciniomycotina subdivision of the Basidiomycota. The class contains a single order, the Classiculales, which in turn contains the single family Classiculaceae. The family contains two monotypic genera.

References

External links

Basidiomycota classes
Monotypic fungus taxa
Pucciniomycotina
Taxa named by Franz Oberwinkler
Taxa described in 2006